Ursulinacaris is a genus of hurdiid radiodont from the Cambrian of North America. It contains one known species, Ursulinacaris grallae. It was described in 2019, based on fossils of the frontal appendages discovered in the 1990s and thereafter. Unlike all other hurdiids, but like non-hurdiid radiodont, the frontal appendages of Ursulinacaris have two rows of ventral spines called endites instead of one. The endites of Ursulinacaris were very slender, unlike other hurdiids such as Peytoia or Hurdia. Ursulinacaris helps resolve the evolution of hurdiid anatomy, showing what order characteristics of the frontal appendages evolved in by showing that the distinctive shape of hurdiid endites evolved before they transitioned from two rows to one row of endites.

Discovery and naming

Ursulinacaris fossils have been found in the Northwest Territories and Nevada. Most specimens come from the Little Bear biota of the Mount Cap Formation, though one referred specimen is from the Jangle Limestone member of the Carrara Formation of Nevada. Its generic name refers to the Little Bear biota, being derived from Latin "ursulina" meaning "from little bear" and "caris" meaning "crab". The name of the type species, U. grallae, is derived from the Latin word "grallae," which means "stilts,"  as a reference to the shape of the spines.

Gallery

References

Dinocarida
Fossil taxa described in 2019